EKL may refer to

 East Kilbride railway station, in Scotland
 East Kowloon line, in Hong Kong
Estonian Defence League, (Estonian: Eesti Kaitseliit)
 Estonian Writers' Union
 Kol language (Bangladesh)
 League of Estonian Corporations